Vetta di Ron is a mountain of Lombardy, Italy. It has an elevation of 3,137 metres above sea level.

Mountains of the Alps
Alpine three-thousanders
Mountains of Lombardy